Krasny Yar Krasnoyarsk is a Russian rugby union club founded in 1969 in the city of Krasnoyarsk. They compete in the Professional Rugby League, the premier league in the country. They have an operating budget of 2.5m Euros.  Their main rival is fellow Krasnoyarsk based, Enisey-STM.

Krasny-Yar play in white and green, and moved into their own purpose-built stadium.  The stadium holds 3,600 spectators and is the first rugby-specific stadium east of the Urals.  The stadium sold out for a game against VVA-Monino (2 August 2010).

History
Krasny Yar was founded in 1969 in the city of Krasnoyarsk. Krasny Yar have been unsuccessful in the Professional Rugby League era.  The club has not been champions since the Super League era, with their most recent championship being in 2001.  The club's financial resources have also been overtaken by their local rivals, Enisey-STM.

Several New Zealand players signed on to play for Krasny Yar for the 2010 and 2011 Seasons, while the club has also recruited a New Zealand trainer working with the Canterbury Rugby Union.

Honours 

 USSR/Russian Championship (12): 1990, 1991, 1992, 1994, 1995, 1996, 1997, 1998, 2000, 2001, 2013, 2015
 Runner-up (12): 1988, 1993, 1999, 2002, 2006, 2011, 2012, 2014, 2016, 2017, 2018, 2019
 Russian Cup (10): 1995, 1996, 1998, 2003, 2006, 2011, 2013, 2015, 2018–19, 2019
 Russian Supercup (1): 2016
 Nikolaev Cup (2): 2019, 2020
 European Rugby Continental Shield runner-up (1): 2016–17

Record in European Games

Stadium

Current squad
2022 Russian Rugby Championship

Notable players

References

External links

Russian rugby union teams
Professional Rugby League teams
Sport in Krasnoyarsk